

References

African-American theatre
NAACP Theatre Awards
Awards established in 1991
1991 establishments in the United States